Cape Verde competed at the 2020 Summer Paralympics in Tokyo, Japan, from 24 August to 5 September 2021. This was their fifth consecutive appearance at the Summer Paralympics since 2004.

Competitors
The following is the list of number of competitors participating in the Games:

Athletics 

Men's field

Women's track

See also 
 Cape Verde at the Paralympics
 Cape Verde at the 2020 Summer Olympics

External links 
 Paralympics website

Nations at the 2020 Summer Paralympics
2020
Summer Paralympics